Forbidden Trail is a 1932 American pre-Code
western film directed by Lambert Hillyer and starring Buck Jones, Barbara Weeks and George Cooper.

Cast
 Buck Jones as Tom Devlin
 Barbara Weeks as 	Mary Middleton
 George Cooper as Happy - Tom's Sidekick
 Wallis Clark as 	Cash Karger
 Mary Carr as 	Mrs. Middleton
 Albert J. Smith as Burke - Henchman 
 Ed Brady as J. Snodgrass
 Frank Rice as 	Sheriff Hibbs
 Charles Berner as	Johnson - Rancher 
 Charles Brinley as 	Townsman / Nester 
 Buck Bucko as 	Townsman / Nester
 Roy Bucko as 	Townsman / Nester 
 Wong Chung as 	Wong - Chinese Cook 
 Ken Cooper as 	Townsman / Nester 
 Rube Dalroy as 	Mob Member 
 Frank Ellis as 	Ranch Hand 
 Jack Evans as 	Townsman / Nester 
 Tom B. Forman as 	Collins' Ranch Foreman
 Herman Hack as Nester 
 Allen Holbrook as 	Townsman / Nester
 Frank LaRue as	Collins - Rancher
 Bert Lindley as Mob Member 
 Lew Meehan as 	Townsman 
 Art Mix as 	Ranch Hand 
 Buck Moulton as 	Collins Ranch Hand 
 Jack Rockwell as 	Townsman 
 Dick Rush as 	Wright - Rancher 
 Blackjack Ward as Townsman

References

Bibliography
 Fetrow, Alan G. . Sound films, 1927-1939: a United States Filmography. McFarland, 1992.
 Pitts, Michael R. Western Movies: A Guide to 5,105 Feature Films. McFarland, 2012.

External links
 

1932 films
1932 Western (genre) films
American Western (genre) films
Films directed by Lambert Hillyer
Columbia Pictures films
American black-and-white films
1930s English-language films
1930s American films